Germán Osvaldo López (19191989) was an Argentine politician who served as minister of defense of Raúl Alfonsín.

References

Defense ministers of Argentina
Radical Civic Union politicians
1919 births
1989 deaths